Gwadar East Bay Expressway is a municipal expressway in Gwadar, Balochistan, Pakistan. The six lane expressway was inaugurated by Prime Minister of Pakistan Mian Muhammad Shahbaz Sharif on 3 June 2022. It connects Gwadar Port to the Makran Coastal Highway. The Gwadar Port Authority is supervising the project.

The project is developed as part of the "Early Harvest" scheme of China Pakistan Economic Corridor, and is part of a wider  development package for the city and Port of Gwadar.

Pakistan will be required only to repay the principal value of the loan. As a condition for receiving a zero-interest rate loan, bidding for the project was limited to Chinese state-owned companies, and the contract was awarded on a government-to-government basis.

See also 
 Expressways of Pakistan

References 

China–Pakistan Economic Corridor
Economic development in Pakistan
Infrastructure investment
Nawaz Sharif administration
Proposed transport infrastructure in Pakistan
Expressways in Pakistan
Roads in Balochistan, Pakistan